Supreme Team may refer to:

 Supreme Team (gang)
 Supreme Team (band)
 The Supreme Team, the alias for the union of four hardcore techno artists: Outblast, Angerfist, Tha Playah and Evil Activities